Theta Kappa Omega, also known by its nicknames TKO or "Teke", was a social Secondary Fraternities for high school–aged men founded in 1872 at California Military Academy in Mayfield, California. The fraternity established local chapters in towns and cities across the United States. The chapters were run by a chapter president, known as the Grand Master, and other elected officers. The national fraternity was governed by an elected body of alumni known as the Grand Council. National conventions were held annually.

History
The history of Theta Kappa Omega Fraternity between 1872 and 1926 is very vague.  During that period, the national headquarters were in the hands of Alpha, the oldest chapter.  In 1899, all records were destroyed by a fire at Alpha, located at California Military Academy.

Founding
On November 13, 1872, three young men decided to meet to discuss the problem of one of their comrades.  This fourth friend was of high moral character and was endowed with great intelligence.  Although so blessed, he had little wealth and planned to soon discontinue his education since he could no longer pay all of his school expenses.  That night, three young men pledged to each other that they would pay the expenses of their comrade to enable him to continue his higher education.

In 1875, this beloved young friend graduated from the California academy, after having received help from his three companions for the past three years.  He had decided that such unselfish, brotherly acts should continue, not ending with himself.  He felt his friends' deed should be recognized; that young men of the future should endeavor to follow in their footsteps.  To show his gratitude, and in an effort to insure the brotherly love and help should be extended to all deserving students, he organized an undergraduate group into a fraternity to continue in the first group's tradition.  He selected the name of Theta Kappa Omega. This first chapter, Alpha Chapter of California Military Academy, was located in Mayfield, California.

Peaks and valleys
T.K.O. was at a peak between 1885 and 1905, but during the period 1915 through 1924, the lack of organization, poor leadership, and strict rules prevented any secret organization from expanding.  There was, however, one installation - Beta Chapter, and when the California Military Academy ruled against fraternities, Alpha Chapter was dissolved, and Beta Chapter took over the national leadership.  Beta's fate - a school ruling against fraternities - as Alpha's, made disbandment necessary, and finally Delta Chapter of Columbia Military Academy became the official national headquarters.  All history concerning Beta and a subsequent chapter, Gamma, has been hopelessly lost.  However, it is noted that Gamma Chapter ceased to exist before 1911.

From past records, it is noted that on September 28, 1906, Charles Shamotulski and Carl T. McPheeters founded Delta Chapter at Columbia Military Academy.  Between 1906 and 1911, little is known about the chapter.   In 1911, William H. Riley was Grand Master of Delta, and therefore, the National President.  The following year he transferred to Gulf Coast Military Academy where he installed Zeta Chapter in October, the first fraternity in that school.

Delta Chapter is responsible for the installation of Chi and Epsilon Chapters at Atlanta, Georgia and also Alpha Beta at Memphis, Tennessee.  These chapters were formed in a city rather than a school, an innovation for T.K.O., selecting outstanding boys of a town rather than the usual military boarding school.

Chi Chapter was formerly Delta Tau Sigma Fraternity, a local, which was organized February 24, 1923.  Immediately following their petition to Delta Chapter, H. Grayson Lambert, Jr., Delta Chapter Grand Master, and G. O. Melchor installed them into the bonds of T.K.O.  The first Grand Master of Chi Chapter was Frank M. Boston.  The other officers were Charles C. Romines, Master; Henry Brookour, Corresponding Secretary; John D. Grand, Sergeant-at- Arms.  Bryant Shelnutt, the Grand Master in 1925-1926, was a charter member.  Chi Chapter was admitted into the Pan Hellenic Council of Boy's High School soon after it became a chapter.  Shortly after Chi Chapter was installed in Atlanta, Georgia, Epsilon Chapter was also founded there.  This was the first time there existed two chapters of T.K.O in the same city.

In September 1925, Warfield Rogers, H. Grayson Lambert, Jr., Harry Rogers, Grattan Brown, Herman Jorgenson, and Julian James met in Memphis, Tennessee and decided that in the best interest of their fraternity, the national headquarters should be moved from Delta Chapter of Columbia, Tennessee, to Memphis, Tennessee, and that the national work of the fraternity should be carried on by a body of alumni from three or more chapters, this body of men to be known as the Grand Council.

Expansion
Between 1925 and 1930, thirty-seven chapters were installed.

In January 1928, the ritual and blackbook were printed and distributed by the Grand Council.  In the same year, the official song of T.K.O. was written by Oscar Hurt and Julian James.  The Endowment Fund of T.K.O. was established at the Biloxi Convention in 1933.  Eight hundred dollars left from the administration of John Singreen was used to start the Endowment Fund, and ever since, Brother Singreen has served as its trustee. J.B. Hermon was instrumental in building the Fund during the years of 1934-1940 to about $3,000.

Because of the great need for a revision of the blackbook, John Singreen revised it and the new blackbook was issued in February 1935.  Brother Singreen also compiled the National Directory in 1932.

1940s and 1950s
The late forties were marked by some twenty active chapters, with the best attended conventions in its history.  Some two hundred brothers gathered in Atlanta, Memphis, or New Orleans.  Following this period, the early 1950s saw an increase in anti-fraternity activity, and subsequently, a reduction in the active chapters, with a low of eight in 1957.  However, this period was certainly not without bright spots - the "Teke Echoes" became firmly established under the supervision of Jack Francis as the leading secondary fraternity publication; Tekes assumed leadership positions in the Inter-Fraternity Congress; and conventions were held in such places as New Orleans, Mobile, and Biloxi.

The installation of Theta Gamma in 1959 signaled new success in the expansion efforts of the fraternity.  The reactivation of Zeta Nu and Delta Epsilon and the installation of Theta Zeta, Theta Eta, and Theta Mu brought new zest to the fraternity and an era of greater acceptance of the role of fraternities began.

1960s
1963 saw the Endowment Fund reach the long sought objective of $10,000.

Because of financial inflation occurring in the nation, in 1967, T.K.O. raised its national dues from the original $40.00 per chapter, which had been established in 1925, to $60.00 per chapter.  1968 saw a second expansion wave starting with the installation of Theta Kappa, Theta Lambda, and Theta Nu.

Fraternity symbols
The original coat-of-arms showed the Griffin standing rampant, or, in full standing position, with a smaller shield, and the paw grasping the sword at a salute.  In September 1925, the Grand Council changed from the original to the present one that displays a Maltese Cross, a sword, and a helmet upon the shield.  From the top of the shield extends the head of an eagle, and above its head rests a crown.  This coat-of-arms, together with the badge of membership, represents TKO's.

The badge of membership is in the shape of a diamond with the Maltese Cross in the top corner.  Across the middle, the Greek letters, Theta Kappa Omega are printed.  Below that the Greek letters of the member's chapter are printed.  Theta Kappa Omega is the only secondary fraternity which has the individual member chapter's Greek letters on its badge.

The pledge pin is in the shape of a triangle with the Greek letters Theta Kappa Omega written across the bottom.  The Greek letters are gold and the pin is completely black.

The official song is "SWEETHEART of T.K.O."; the words are written by Oscar Hurt and Julian James, and the music by Rupert Biggadike, recorded by Columbia Phonograph Co. in 1928, with music provided by Oscar Celestin and his original Tuxedo Band of New Orleans.

The official flower of T.K.O. is the White Rose.  The official colors of T.K.O. are black, white and gold.

External links
Any TKO members should follow that attached link to connect to TKO alumni:
 TKO Yahoo Group
 TKO Facebook page

High school fraternities and sororities
Fraternities and sororities in the United States
Student organizations established in 1872
1872 establishments in California